Nicola Valentine Willis (born 7 March 1981) is Deputy Leader of the National Party and its finance spokesperson in the New Zealand Parliament. Willis inherited Steven Joyce's seat in Parliament as the next on the party list after his retirement from politics in March 2018.

Early life
Willis was born and raised in Port Howard, Wellington. She is the eldest of three children. Willis's mother was a journalist in the Parliamentary Press Gallery, her father a partner in corporate law firm Bell Gully. After a "privileged childhood", she first attended Samuel Marsden Collegiate, a private school for girls, before asking to spend her last two years of high school boarding at King's College in Auckland – a decision she regretted. Her first job was as a cashier and server at a Wholly Bagel Café in Wellington, later working in retail stores selling clothing.

She graduated with a first-class honours degree in English literature from Victoria University of Wellington in 2003, and earned a post-graduate diploma in journalism from the University of Canterbury in 2017. She was a member of the Victoria University Debating Society, and competed in international tournaments.

After graduation, she took up a position as a research and policy advisor for Bill English and went on to serve as a senior advisor to John Key in 2008. In 2012, Willis joined dairy co-operative Fonterra, taking on senior management roles, as well as serving on the board of Export NZ, a division of lobbyist group Business New Zealand.

Political career

First term
Willis contested the 2017 election as National's candidate for the electorate of Wellington Central, and was number 48 on the party list. She gained 26% of the electorate vote after distribution of preferences. On the party list vote, National lost two parliamentary seats while the Labour and Green parties each gained one. Willis was second in line should there be a vacancy in a list seat held by a National Party MP during the 52nd New Zealand Parliament, and  she and Maureen Pugh entered parliament several months later, after the resignations of Bill English and Steven Joyce in March 2018.

Leader Simon Bridges appointed Willis National's spokesperson on early childhood education.

Willis was vocal against Grant Guilford's attempt to change Victoria University of Wellington's name to the University of Wellington.

Willis was a key player in Todd Muller's move to replace Bridges as caucus leader in a 2020 the leadership coup, with she and Chris Bishop both taking a role as Muller's "numbers man".  She was rewarded with a ranking of 14 in the party caucus, and with the additional portfolios of Housing and Urban Development. Only 55 days later Muller resigned, becoming the shortest-serving leader of any political party represented in Parliament in New Zealand's history. His replacement Judith Collins left Willis at the same ranking, but with Muller's departure she automatially joined the front bench as 13th in caucus. Collins also granted her the opposition education spokesperson role. With Muller's backers Bishop and Willis rising under Collins, political commentators speculated that "potential dissenters are being kept busy with big new portfolios".

Second term and deputy leadership

Willis' list ranking for the 2020 general election was 13, making her return to parliament a certainty. Although she also contested the Wellington Central electorate, voters soundly preferred the incumbent Grant Robertson by more than 3 to 1, with him gaining 27,000 votes compared to her 8,500. National was returned to Opposition and Willis was returned to the housing portfolio, where she worked with Housing Minister Megan Woods to develop bipartisan housing reform designed to encourage more medium density dwellings.

National Party leader Judith Collins lost a confidence vote and was removed by the National caucus on 25 November 2021. Willis was seen by the media and commentators as a contender for the party leadership or deputy leadership. Despite the speculation, Willis never launched a leadership bid, although was asked by Botany MP and former Air New Zealand CEO Christopher Luxon to be his running mate as he launched campaign for the leadership. She and Luxon were elected deputy leader and leader, respectively, unopposed on 30 November 2021, after Luxon's main rival, Simon Bridges, dropped his leadership bid in exchange for the finance portfolio. As deputy leader, Willis's liberal views on social issues are seen as a counterpoint to Luxon's more conservative positions.

Luxon unveiled his first shadow cabinet in December. Willis was assigned responsibility for housing and social investment. She picked up the finance portfolio in March 2022 when Bridges announced his resignation. As finance spokesperson, Willis defended National's policy of lowering tax rates despite criticisms that the policy would be inflationary; Luxon eventually dropped the policy. 

On 19 November 2022, Willis was selected as the National candidate for the north Wellington electorate of Ōhāriu ahead of the 2023 New Zealand general election, instead of trying for a third time in Wellington Central. Ōhāriu was regarded by some commentators as "much more winnable" for Willis than Wellington Central.

Political beliefs
Willis is described as a social liberal, and has a focus on LGBT rights and action on climate change. She is a member of the National Party's BlueGreen environmental caucus. Willis supports euthanasia, and is pro-choice.

In the 2020 New Zealand general election, Willis' unsuccessful campaign in the Wellington Central focussed heavily on increasing roading in the central city, with the slogan 'Four Lanes to the Planes'.

Personal life 
Willis married Duncan Small in 2007, and they have four children.

References

1981 births
Living people
New Zealand National Party MPs
Unsuccessful candidates in the 2017 New Zealand general election
21st-century New Zealand politicians
21st-century New Zealand women politicians
New Zealand list MPs
Members of the New Zealand House of Representatives
People from Wellington City
Victoria University of Wellington alumni
University of Canterbury alumni
Fonterra people
Candidates in the 2020 New Zealand general election
Women deputy opposition leaders
Deputy opposition leaders
People educated at Samuel Marsden Collegiate School
People educated at King's College, Auckland